Indian Institute of Science Education and Research, Bhopal (IISER-B or IISER – Bhopal) is an autonomous research institute in Bhauri, Bhopal district, Madhya Pradesh, India. It was established by the Ministry of Education (India), Government of India in 2008 in order to incorporate research in fundamental science at undergraduate and graduate level, with equal emphasis on higher education for research and education in science. It is an autonomous institution awarding its own degrees.

History

Indian Institutes of Science Education and Research (IISERs) were created in 2006 through a proclamation of Ministry of Human Resource Development, Government of India, under the category of institutes of national importance, to promote quality education and research in basic sciences. Soon after the announcement, two of these institutes at Pune and Kolkata, respectively, were started in 2006. This was followed by institutes at Mohali (2007), Bhopal and Thiruvananthapuram (2008), Tirupati (2015) and Berhampur (2016). Each IISER is a degree granting autonomous institution with a prime focus to integrate science, education and research.

Departments
Natural Sciences Stream
Biological Sciences: Bachelor of Science|BS-Master of Science|MS (Dual Degree) and PhD programmes
Chemistry:  BS-MS (Dual Degree), Integrated PhD and PhD programmes
Earth and Environmental Sciences: BS-MS (Dual Degree) and PhD programmes
Mathematics: BS-MS (Dual Degree), Integrated PhD and PhD programmes
Physics: BS-MS (Dual-Degree), Integrated PhD and PhD programmes

Engineering Sciences Stream
Chemical Engineering: BS, BS-MS (Dual Degree), and PhD programmes
Data Science Engineering: BS, BS-MS (Dual Degree), and PhD programmes
Electrical Engineering & Computer Science: BS, BS-MS (Dual Degree), and PhD programmes

Humanities and Social Sciences Stream
Economic Sciences: BS, BS-MS (Dual Degree), and PhD programmes
Humanities and Social Sciences: PhD programme

Academics

Academic programmes 
IISER Bhopal offer BS-MS (Dual Degree) program, Integrated PhD program in Chemistry, Mathematics and Physics and PhD program in Biological Sciences, Chemistry, Earth & Environmental Sciences (EES), Mathematics, Physics, Chemical Engineering, Electrical Engineering & Computer Science (EECS),  Data Science and Engineering (DSE) and Economic Science.

Bachelor of Science – Master of Science (BS-MS) 
The five year BS-MS (Dual Degree) Program is offered in Biological Sciences, Chemistry, Mathematics, Physics and Earth & Environmental Sciences (EES). The institute will also be offering BS-MS (Dual Degree) program in Chemical Engineering and Electrical Engineering & Computer Science. BS-MS (Dual Degree) program consists of mandatory, common courses (core courses) for all disciplines during the first two years and discipline dependent professional courses during the remaining three years. Core courses include topics from all the four science disciplines in addition to interdisciplinary courses in earth and environmental sciences, computer science and humanities. In the final year, BS-MS students are required to undertake project work with a faculty supervisor, relevant to their major discipline.

In addition to majoring in one of the five (Biological Sciences, Chemistry, Earth and Environmental Sciences, Mathematics, and Physics) science disciplines, BS-MS students can also minor in another disciplines.

The Institute encourages and rewards academic excellence exhibited by its students. To this end, Professor C. N. R. Rao Education Foundation Prize with a prize amount of  5000/- per semester is awarded to a student scoring the highest CPI during the first year (in both the first and second semesters) of the BS-MS (Dual Degree) program.

In addition, the Institute awards the President's gold medal for the best academic performance in the graduating class in all disciplines of the BS-MS program. Proficiency Medals are the awarded for the best academic performance in each discipline of the BS-MS program to the graduating class. A Director's gold medal is awarded for outstanding all-round achievement and leadership in the graduating class in all disciplines.

Bachelor of Science in Economic Sciences 
The institute also offers four years BS Program in Economic Sciences for bright and motivated science students who have passed (10+2) with mathematics as one of the subjects. The program integrates classroom learning with research. The training during the programme enables students to pursue careers in academia, industry or government organizations.

 The first year of the program consists of core courses in basic sciences and introductory courses in Economics.
 The next three years are dedicated to specialization in Economic Sciences.
 The students pursuing the BS Program in Economic Sciences can also earn a 'minor' degree in other disciplines after fulfilling the prerequisites laid down by the respective department.
 After spending four years in BS program in Economic Sciences, students have the option to obtain BS-MS (Dual Degree) in Economic Sciences by spending an additional year devoted to courses and research project.

Integrated PhD program (I-PhD) 
The institute offers Integrated PhD program in Chemistry, Mathematics and Physics. Physics Department takes I-PhD candidates from JEST channel, Chemistry Department usually takes students from IIT-JAM.  All admitted students will receive a fellowship of Rs. 10,000/- pm in the initial two years subject to satisfactory performance in their course work. Subsequently, the fellowship will be revised to comply with the existing MHRD norms.

Students must successfully complete course work, qualifying examination, seminars, and a dissertation. Besides the mandatory requirements, students are encouraged to participate in several professional activities such as workshops, review meetings and conferences.

Doctoral program (PhD) 
Admission to the doctoral program is after a master's degree in science. Besides the students of the Integrated Master's program, postgraduate students with a master's degree in science from other Universities/Institutes are also admitted to the doctoral program.

The institute also offers PhD programs in all disciplines. All selected candidates not receiving external fellowship are awarded an Institute fellowship. Currently, the institute offers PhD programs in the following disciplines: Biological Sciences, Chemistry, Chemical Engineering, Earth and Environmental Sciences, Electrical Engineering & Computer Science, Mathematics, Physics and English. All doctoral students are also expected to participate in the undergraduate teaching program of the Institute as a part of their training. The program involved course work, a qualifying examination, a state-of-the-art seminar, thesis work, open seminar and a thesis examination, leading to the award of a PhD degree.

Postdoctoral Studies 
Postdoctoral studies are possible in Biology, Chemistry, Earth and Environmental Sciences, Mathematics, Physics, Chemical Engineering, Electrical Engineering & Computer Science.

Ranking 

Indian Institute of Science Education and Research, Bhopal ranked 40th by the National Institutional Ranking Framework in overall ranking in 2020.

Admissions

BS-MS (Dual Degree) 
The process of admissions in all IISERs is managed by the Joint Admissions Committee (JAC), headed by a chairman and having members from all IISERs. The details regarding admissions in all IISERs can be obtained at IISER admissions website

Channels of Admission
Students are admitted to the programme through the following channels:

 Kishore Vaigyanik Protsahan Yojana (KVPY) Basic Science Stream: Candidates having a valid KVPY fellowship are eligible to apply for admissions. Additional cut off criteria may be applicable.

 Joint Entrance Exam (Advanced): Candidates in General category securing a rank within 10000 in the Common Rank List (CRL) of JEE Advanced are eligible to apply. For candidates belonging to reserved category (OBC-NCL, SC, ST, PD, EWS), their category rank would be used. Additional cut off criteria may be applicable.

 State and Central Boards: Students who have passed (10+2) level with science stream during the current or previous year with marks equal or above the cut off percentage in their respective boards are eligible to apply.

Indian nationals and students belonging to PIO or OCI category are eligible to apply provided they satisfy the eligibility criteria described above.

Scholarship
KVPY scholars admitted to IISERs would draw fellowship as per KVPY norms. In addition, a limited number of INSPIRE scholarships will be available for candidates admitted through JEE Advanced and SCB channels as per the norms prescribed by DST INSPIRE scheme.

Reservation
IISERs follow Government of India rules regarding reservation for seat allocation in Central institutes of higher education.

Bachelor of Science (BS) programme

IISER Bhopal offers four years BS Programme for bright and motivated science students who have passed (10+2) with Mathematics as one of the subjects. The programme integrates classroom learning with research. The training during the programme enables students to pursue careers in academia, industry or government organizations.

BS Programme is offered in two broad streams:

Engineering sciences disciplines

After completing a common curriculum in the first two years, students can choose from one amongst the three major disciplines currently being offered:
 Chemical engineering
 Data science and engineering
 Electrical engineering and computer science
The courses in the above disciplines are designed to enable students to pursue careers in the industry, academia, or government organizations.

Humanities and social science discipline (economic sciences) 

The first year of the programme consists of core courses in basic sciences and introductory courses in Economics. The next three years are dedicated to specialization in Economic Sciences.

The students pursuing the BS Programme can also earn a 'minor' degree in other disciplines after fulfilling the prerequisites laid down by the respective department. After spending four years in the BS programme, students have the option to obtain BS-MS (Dual Degree) by spending an additional year devoted to courses and research thesis.

Integrated PhD (I-PhD)
Admission to the Integrated PhD programme will be made once a year during May/June. Advertisement would be floated between March/April. Candidates must have a bachelor's degree. A written or oral exam will be conducted at the campus. A prospective candidate should have completed a graduate programme (BSc/BTech/B.E.) in a discipline relevant to his/her choice of Integrated PhD programme. Candidates seeking admission in Chemistry should have a valid JAM score. Candidates seeking admission in Physics should have a valid JEST rank

PhD
Applications are invited twice a year. A prospective candidate should have completed a postgraduate programme (M.S./MSc/MTech/MBBS) in a discipline relevant to his/her choice of PhD programme along with qualifying a national entrance exam. Students should have a valid rank in the Graduate Aptitude Test in Engineering (GATE) and/or have qualified the Council of Scientific and Industrial Research (CSIR)/University Grants Commission (UGC)/National Eligibility Test – Junior Research Fellowship (NET-JRF), or other equivalent examinations. All selected candidates not receiving external fellowship will be awarded an Institute fellowship.

Student life

Students Activity Council
Students Activity Council (SAC) is a union of the students for organisation of extracurricular activities in the Institute and to address their concerns. It is totally managed, organised and maintained by the students themselves. SAC contains 8 different Activity Councils:
 Computing and Networking Council.
 Cultural Council.
 Fine Arts and Literary Council.
 Science Council.
 Sports Council.
 Student Development Council.
 Environmental and Social Initiative Council.
 Representatives' Council.
 Centre for Science and Society

IISER Bhopal has hosted the 4th Inter IISER Sports Meet (IISM 2015), 9 institutes participated in this event ( 6 IISERs, IISc, NISER, CBS Mumbai). The institute also organised a Summer Outreach Camp from 15th May- 21st May, 2022. Roughly 95 students had attended the camp from all over India for the same.

IISER Bhopal hosts two annual festivals. Enthuzia is the cultural festival of IISER Bhopal. It was started in 2010. Enthuzia '19 witnessed Zakir Khan, the Indian comedian, as one of the performers. Singularity is the annual science festival of IISER Bhopal. Singularity'16, the third edition, witnessed K. Radhakrishnan as keynote speaker.

References

External links
 
 The IISER System

Universities and colleges in Bhopal
Universities and colleges in Madhya Pradesh
Science education in India
Bhopal, Indian Institutes of Science Education and Research
Research institutes established in 2008
Materials science institutes
2008 establishments in Madhya Pradesh
Research institutes in Bhopal
Education research institutes